Zemp is a surname. Notable people with the surname include:

Hugo Zemp (born 1937), Swiss-French musicologist
Josef Zemp (1834–1908), Swiss politician
Werner Zemp (1906–1959), German-Swiss poet and translator

See also
Zepp (surname)